The Attributes of the Arts, The Attributes of Music and The Attributes of the Sciences are three paintings by Jean Siméon Chardin. They were commissioned in 1764 by the marquis de Marigny, younger brother of Madame de Pompadour and exhibited at the Salon the following year. At the centre of Arts is a model for Edmé Bouchardon's statue personifying Paris for the fontaine de Grenelle. Arts and Music are now in the Musée du Louvre and Sciences has disappeared.

External links
Cartelfr.louvre.fr
Cartelfr.louvre.fr

1765 paintings
Paintings by Jean-Baptiste-Siméon Chardin
Paintings in the Louvre by French artists
Musical instruments in art